A Place to Grow (aka Moissons du coeur, Les France French TV title) is a 1995 drama film written and directed by Merlin (Merle) Miller.

Plot
Upon his brother's death, Matt Walker, a recording artist, returns to his hometown to sell the family farm. Upon returning home, Matt rekindles a relationship with his high school sweetheart, who is now married to the secretive  Paul and lives next door. Matt is pressured to sell his family farm to a wealth developer, who is buying up property around town and putting local farmers out of business. Matt, who suspects foul play in his brother Scott’s death, attempts to find his murderer.

Synopsis
After moving back home to the farm after his brother's death, a musician and his family begin to suspect that the brother's death may not have been accidental, and that a local businessman may be involved.

Cast
 Gary Morris as Matt Walker
 Tracy Kristofferson as Cheryl Shuler
 John Beck as Paul Shuler
 Nikki Dunaway as Laura Shuler
 Wilford Brimley as Jake
 Boxcar Willie as Carl Betz
 Woody P. Snow as Bill Carlson
 Ed Mosher as Pastor at the cemetery
 David C. Henry as behind the scenes cameraman
 David C. Henry Sr. as a walkby in the livestock show scene
 Max Lawmaster as a person in the restaurant scene
 Ed Marshall as Dan
 Sandy Lowe as Linda
 Marilyn Harper as Peg
 Gerry Cooney as 4H judge
 Juice Newton as Centennial Singer
 Steve Wariner as Centennial Singer
 John Hornsby as Centennial Singer
 R.J. Burns as Scott Walker
 Michelle Tennis as Michelle

Soundtracks
 "A Place to Grow", written by Steve Wariner, performed by Gary Morris, courtesy of Steve Wariner Music (BMI)
 "Where Were You?", written by Gary Morris and Jeff Rea, performed by Gary Morris and Juice Newton, courtesy of Logrhythm Music (BMI)
 "Big Ole Black Guitar", written by Chuck Glass, Jim Glass, and Mike Lamb, performed by John Hornsby, courtesy of Logrhythm Music (BMI)
 "Empty", written by Gary Morris and Jeff Rea, performed by Gary Morris, courtesy of Logrhythm Music (BMI)
 "Symptoms of Love", written by Jon McElroy and Craig Karp, performed by Juice Newton, courtesy of Logrhythm Music (BMI)
 "A Month of Blue Mondays", written by Craig Karp and Dave Gibson, performed by Steve Wariner, courtesy of Logrhythm Music (BMI)
 "The Land", written by Jeff Rea and Jon McElroy, performed by Marty Raybon, courtesy of Logrhythm Music (BMI)
 "Laura's Song", written by Dottie Moore and Jeff Rea, performed by Gary Morris, courtesy of Logrhythm Music (BMI)
 "Amazing Grace", arranged and performed by Gary Morris
 "The Window", written by Jon McElroy and Stan Munsey, Jr., performed by Gary Morris, courtesy of Logrhythm Music (BMI) and Royalhaven Music, Inc. (BMI)
 "Back on the Tractor", written by Jon McElroy and Tony Mullins, performed by Matt King, courtesy of Logrhythm Music (BMI) and G.I.D. Music, Inc. (ASCAP)
 "Never Did Say Goodbye", written by Jeff Black, performed by Lisa Brokop, courtesy of Warner-Tamberlane Publishing Corp.
 "Bidding America Goodbye", written by Jamie O'Hara, performed by Tanya Tucker, courtesy of Sony Songs, Inc./Eiffel Tower Music (BMI)
 "For Your Love", written by Joe Ely, performed by Chris LeDoux, courtesy of Sony Songs, Inc./Eiffel Tower Music (BMI)

References

External links
 Saint Louis Post Dispatch
 Film and production informations at cinema.theaipolis.com
 
 
 

1995 films
1995 drama films
1998 films
American drama television films
1990s English-language films
1990s American films